Heather Joan Canning (5 January 1933 – 30 May 1996)  was an English actress, who is best known for her television roles. She played Isabel Rockmetteller in "The Full House", the second episode of the third series of the 1990s British comedy television series Jeeves and Wooster.

Career
Canning's stage work included appearances with the RSC, in the West End, and on Broadway.
Her television roles included the soap opera Crossroads (1964), playing Shirley Coniston, and in Morning Story (1970). She was also known for  Miss Julie (1972), Tis Pity She's a Whore (1980) and A Village Affair (1995).

Personal life
Canning was born in Epsom, Surrey. She was married to the Australian actor Leon Lissek.  She died, aged 63, in Oxford.

References

External links
 
 

English stage actresses
English film actresses
English television actresses
1933 births
1996 deaths